Maria Christina "Tina" Aumont (February 14, 1946 – October 28, 2006) was an American actress. She was the daughter of French actor Jean-Pierre Aumont and Dominican actress Maria Montez. She made her acting debut in the British film Modesty Blaise (1966), but later had a prominent career as a leading lady in Italian films.

Career
Aumont was billed as Tina Marquand (her married name) in four films, including Joseph Losey's Modesty Blaise (1966). She was photographed by Angelo Frontoni (it) in 1968, when she had ankle/floor length hair, and some semi-nude pictures from this session were published in Playboy in 1969. She worked in Italian cinema with, among others, Alberto Sordi (Scusi, lei è favorevole o contrario?, 1966), Tinto Brass (The Howl, 1970 and Salon Kitty, 1975), Sergio Martino (Torso, 1973), Mauro Bolognini (Drama of the Rich, 1974), Francesco Rosi (Illustrious Corpses, 1975), and Federico Fellini (Fellini's Casanova, 1976). She also played Lonetta, the Indian maiden, in Texas Across the River (1967), Luciana in Malicious (1973) and Valentina in A Matter of Time (1976) starring Liza Minnelli. She starred in Lifespan (1975) with Klaus Kinski.

Death
In 2000, she retired from film work. In 2006, she suffered a pulmonary embolism and died in Port-Vendres, Pyrénées-Orientales, France, aged 60.

Partial filmography

Modesty Blaise (1966) - Nicole
The Game Is Over (1966) - Anne Sernet
Texas Across the River (1966) - Lonetta
Pardon, Are You For or Against? (1966) - Romina
Man, Pride and Vengeance (1967) - Carmen / Conchita
Your Turn to Die (1967) - Dolly
Partner (1968) - Salesgirl
Alibi (1969) - Filli
Satyricon (1969) - Circe
Giacomo Casanova: Childhood and Adolescence (1969) - Marcella
Come ti chiami, amore mio? (1969)
Metello (1970) - Idina
The Howl (1970) - Anita Annigoni
Corbari (1970) - Ines
Necropolis (1970)
The Virgin's Bed (1970) - Prisoner
Il sergente Klems (1971) - Leila
Bianco, rosso e... (1972) - Mrs. Ricci
Arcana (1972) - Brenda
Racconti proibiti... di niente vestiti (1972) - Dirce
Torso (1973) - Daniela / college student
Malicious (1973) - Luciana
Storia de fratelli e de cortelli (1973) - Mara
Blu Gang e vissero per sempre felici e ammazzati (1973) - Polly
Les hautes solitudes (1974) - Tina
The Murri Affair (1974) - Rosa Bonetti
Il trafficone (1974) - Laura
Lifespan (1975) - Anna
The Divine Nymph (1975) - Woman at party (uncredited)
The Messiah (1975) - Adulteress
La principessa nuda (1976) - Gladys
Illustrious Corpses (1976) - The prostituteHerta Wallenberg
Salon Kitty (1976) - Herta Wallenberg
Giovannino (1976) - Nelly
A Matter of Time (1976) - Valentina
Fellini's Casanova (1976) - Henriette / Casanova's lover
A Simple Heart (1977) - Virginia
La deuxième femme (1978) - Herself
Holocaust parte seconda: i ricordi, i deliri, la vendetta (1980) - Dorothea's Mother
Rebelote (1984) - La bouchère
Les frères Pétard (1986)
ZEN - Zona Espansione Nord (1988)
Sale comme un ange (1991) - (scenes deleted)
Les deux orphelines vampires (1997) - La Goule
Giulia (1999) - La Mère / Mother
La mécanique des femmes (2000) - (final film role)

References

External links
 
 
 Biography of Tina Aumont, including further readings

1946 births
2006 deaths
Actresses from Hollywood, Los Angeles
American film actresses
American people of French-Jewish descent
American people of Dominican Republic descent
Burials at Montparnasse Cemetery
Respiratory disease deaths in France
Deaths from pulmonary embolism
20th-century American actresses
21st-century American women
Signatories of the 1971 Manifesto of the 343